Cornerstone Research is a litigation consulting firm based in the United States and the United Kingdom. It provides economic and financial analysis and expert testimony  to attorneys, corporations and government agencies involved in complex litigation and regulatory proceedings.

Practice areas
Cornerstone Research utilizes both internal and external expert witnesses to provide testimony, utilizing faculty and industry experts.

The company's practice areas include: accounting; antitrust and competition; bankruptcy and financial distress litigation; consumer fraud and product liability; corporate and government investigations; corporate governance; corporate transaction litigation; data analytics; Employee Retirement Income Security Act (ERISA); energy and commodities; financial institutions; intellectual property; international arbitration and litigation; labor and employment; pharmaceuticals and healthcare;  real estate; securities; and valuation.

Publications
The firm collaborates on the "Securities Class Action Clearinghouse" in conjunction with the Stanford University Law School.  According to a University website, the clearinghouse provides summary information regarding federal class action securities litigation in the United States.

See also
Analysis Group
Bates White
Berkeley Research Group
Charles River Associates
Compass Lexecon
NERA Economic Consulting

References

External links
Official Website

Macroeconomics consulting firms
Companies based in San Francisco
1989 establishments in the United States
Companies established in 1989